Blondie's Anniversary is a 1947 American comedy film directed by Abby Berlin and starring Penny Singleton, Arthur Lake, and Larry Simms. It is the twenty-second of the 28 Blondie films.

Plot

Dagwood is holding a watch, a gift that his boss George Radcliffe bought for a prospective customer's secretary, Gloria Stafford, as sort of a bribe.

Cast
 Penny Singleton as Blondie
 Arthur Lake as Dagwood
 Larry Simms as Baby Dumpling
 Marjorie Ann Mutchie as Cookie
 Daisy as Daisy the Dog
 Adele Jergens as Gloria Stafford
 Jerome Cowan as Mr. Radcliffe
 Grant Mitchell as Samuel Breckenbridge
 William Frawley as Sharkey
 Edmund MacDonald as Bob Burley
 Fred S. Sears as Bert Dalton
 Jack Rice as Ollie Shaw
 Alyn Lockwood as Mary
 Frank Wilcox as Carter

References

External links
 
 
 
 

1947 films
Columbia Pictures films
American black-and-white films
Blondie (film series) films
1947 comedy films
American comedy films
Films directed by Abby Berlin
1940s American films